John Walker was an American animator and director. His first credit was The Dick Tracy Show.  He directed various animations from 1960 to 1994.

See also
 A Charlie Brown Christmas (1965) - graphic blandishment
 Charlie Brown's All-Stars (1966) - graphic blandishment
 You're in Love, Charlie Brown (1967) - graphic blandishment

External links

American animators
Place of birth missing
2016 deaths